An arm of the sea (or sea arm) may refer to:

a sea loch
an ocean arm
Arms of the Sea, a 2006 album by Celtic musician Heather Alexander
Nullah, in Hindi
Gulf of Lune, a fictitious sea arm in J.R.R. Tolkien's Middle-earth fantasy universe